"Rats" is a song by the Swedish rock band Ghost. It was released as the first single from their fourth album Prequelle. The track topped the Billboard Mainstream Rock Songs chart in July 2018, and was nominated for the Best Rock Song Grammy Award at the 61st Annual Grammy Awards.

Background and release
The song debuted on April 12, 2018, on SiriusXM, and was officially released the following day. The song is the lead single from Ghost's fourth studio album, Prequelle, ahead of the album's release on June 1. As with prior music with the band, the song was created by Tobias Forge and a group of anonymous band members called "Nameless Ghouls". However, the song was the first to feature Forge's new alter ego stage name, Cardinal Copia, and was performed by a separate set of anonymous band members than prior material, with all prior band members leaving the band in 2017 following a lawsuit with Forge regarding pay. The song's music video was also released on April 13. Journalists noted that the video's style and dancing appeared to be influenced by Michael Jackson's music video for his song "Thriller".

Themes and composition
Forge wrote the track to serve as "a big opening track that just blows people's minds immediately". The song was also written to be performed as a concert opener for large arena shows; he previously wrote "Square Hammer" for that purpose, and was successful with it, but didn't want to feel stuck always playing one particular song as a concert opener, as he perceived is what happened to the Rolling Stones with their song "Start Me Up". Metal Injection described the song as sounding similar to 1980s Ozzy Osbourne, calling it "as heavy metal as you wanted it to be, with killer guitar solos, a badass drum intro, and riffs that sound like they might've been sitting in Ozzy's basement since the 80s." Forge himself confirmed that the song's creation was influenced by hearing Osbourne open up a concert with their song "I Don't Know" off of their 1980 album Blizzard of Ozz in the 1980s.

Lyrically, the song is about humanity's tendency to rush to judgement and mob mentality. Forge explained:

Reception
Greg Kennelty of Metal Injection praised the song for being "darker" and "heavier" than the material from their prior album Meliora, concluding that "if you've been dying for something like Ghost's debut album Opus Eponymous with a more updated sound, then you're going to absolutely love 'Rats'." Vince Neilstein of Metal Sucks similarly praised it for its catchy guitar riffs.

Track listing

Digital download

7" single

Awards and nominations

Personnel
Credits adapted from liner notes.

 Tobias Forge – vocals (credited as "Cardinal Copia")
 A Group of Nameless Ghouls – lead guitar, rhythm guitar, bass guitar, drums, keyboards

Charts

Weekly charts

Year-end charts

References

2018 songs
2018 singles
Ghost (Swedish band) songs
Loma Vista Recordings singles
Songs written by Tobias Forge
Songs written by Tom Dalgety
Song recordings produced by Tom Dalgety
Songs about diseases and disorders